Wurtzite is a zinc and iron sulfide mineral with the chemical formula , a less frequently encountered structural polymorph form of sphalerite. The iron content is variable up to eight percent. It is trimorphous with matraite and sphalerite.

It occurs in hydrothermal deposits associated with sphalerite, pyrite, chalcopyrite, barite and marcasite. It also occurs in low-temperature clay-ironstone concretions.

It was first described in 1861 for an occurrence in the San José Mine, Oruro City, Cercado Province, Oruro Department, Bolivia, and named for French chemist Charles-Adolphe Wurtz. It has widespread distribution. In Europe it is reported from Příbram, Czech Republic; Hesse, Germany; and Liskeard, Cornwall, England.  In the US it is reported from Litchfield County, Connecticut; Butte, Silver Bow County, Montana; at Frisco, Beaver County, Utah; and from the Joplin district, Jasper County, Missouri.

Wurtzite structure

The wurtzite group includes cadmoselite (CdSe), greenockite (CdS), mátraite (ZnS), and rambergite (MnS), in addition to wurtzite.

Its crystal structure is called the wurtzite crystal structure, to which it lends its name. This structure is a member of the hexagonal crystal system and consists of tetrahedrally coordinated zinc and sulfur atoms that are stacked in an ABABABABAB pattern.

The unit cell parameters of wurtzite are (-2H polytype):
a = b = 3.81 Å = 381 pm
c = 6.23 Å = 623 pm
V = 78.41 Å3
Z = 2

See also
Wurtzite crystal structure

References

External links
 The Mineral Wurtzite
 

Sulfide minerals
Zinc minerals
Iron minerals
Hexagonal minerals
Minerals in space group 186
Minerals described in 1861

ja:閃亜鉛鉱#ウルツ鉱